Title 48 of the Code of Federal Regulations contains regulations concerning government procurement in the United States.

Structure 

The Federal Acquisition Regulations (FAR) in chapter 1 are those government-wide acquisition regulations jointly issued by the General Services Administration, the Department of Defense, and the National Aeronautics and Space Administration. Chapters 2-99 are acquisition regulations issued by individual government agencies: parts 1-69 are reserved for agency regulations implementing the FAR in chapter 1 and are numerically keyed to them, and parts 70-99 contain agency regulations supplementing the FAR.

 48
Government procurement in the United States